Ray Kendry Páez Andrade (born 4 May 2007) is an Ecuadorian footballer who currently plays as a midfielder for Independiente Del Valle.

Club career
Born in Guayaquil, Páez's performances for the youth team of Independiente del Valle, including being named most outstanding player at the 2022 Next Generation Trophy in Salzburg, Austria, drew the attention of multiple clubs across Europe. He reportedly attracted interest from German club Borussia Dortmund, while English side Manchester United had an opening bid for Páez rejected in December 2022.

He was promoted to the Independiente del Valle first team for 2023 pre-season, at the age of fifteen. On 25 February 2023, he marked his highly anticipated professional debut with a goal; the third in a 3–1 Ecuadorian Serie A win over Mushuc Runa. Having received a lifted cut-back on the right hand side of the penalty area from Anthony Landázuri, he instinctively floated the ball over the goalkeeper, Jorge Pinos, on the volley into the far corner of the goal. In doing so, he became the youngest debutant, and youngest goal-scorer, in the Ecuadorian top flight.

International career
Paéz has represented Ecuador at under-17 level, scoring against both Argentina and Colombia. He was left out of Ecuador's under-20 squad for the 2023 South American U-20 Championship to facilitate his transition into the Independiente del Valle first team squad.

Style of play
Described as a fearless dribbler, Paéz took inspiration from fellow Ecuadorian Gonzalo Plata and Argentine Lionel Messi, both of whom he watched as a child, to improve his own dribbling ability.

Career statistics

Club
.

References

2007 births
Living people
Sportspeople from Guayaquil
Ecuadorian footballers
Ecuador youth international footballers
Association football midfielders
Ecuadorian Serie A players
C.S.D. Independiente del Valle footballers